Coroner's Pidgin is a crime novel by Margery Allingham, first published in 1945, in the United Kingdom by William Heinemann, London and in the United States  by Doubleday Doran, New York  as Pearls Before Swine. It is the twelfth novel in the Albert Campion series.

Plot introduction
Just returned from years overseas on a secret mission, Albert Campion is relaxing in his bath when his servant Magersfontein Lugg and a lady of unmistakably aristocratic bearing appear in his flat carrying the corpse of a woman. At first Campion is unwilling to get involved, but he is forced to bring his powers of detection to bear on the case, and to solve not only the mystery of the murdered woman but also the alarming disappearance of some well-known art treasures.  Campion discovers the clue to the mystery by tracing two bottles of a very rare wine.

References 
 Margery Allingham, Coroner's Pidgin, (London: William Heinemann, 1945)
 Margery Allingham, Coroner's Pidgin, (Vintage, Random House, 2006)

External links 
An Allingham bibliography, with dates and publishers, from the UK Margery Allingham Society
 A page about the book from the Margery Allingham Archive

1945 British novels
Novels by Margery Allingham
British crime novels
Heinemann (publisher) books